Maleyevo is a rural locality (a village) in Kisnemskoye Rural Settlement, Vashkinsky District, Vologda Oblast, Russia. The population was 13 as of 2002.

Geography 
The distance to Lipin Bor is 32 km, to Troitskoye is 8 km. Iyevlevo is the nearest rural locality.

References 

Rural localities in Vashkinsky District